Keith Buckley (born 17 June 1992) is an Irish association football player plays as a central midfielder for the League of Ireland club Bohemians. He served as captain of the club and led his team into their first European match in 7 years when they took on Hungarian side Fehérvár in the 2020-2021 UEFA Europa League qualifiers.

Career 
Keith Buckley was named in the PFAI Team of the Year in 2020.

Career statistics

Honours
 Leinster Senior Cup (1): 2016

References

1992 births
Living people
Bohemian F.C. players
Bray Wanderers F.C. players
Republic of Ireland association footballers
Association football midfielders
League of Ireland players